This is the List of words having different meanings in British and American English: A–L. For the second portion of the list, see List of words having different meanings in British and American English: M–Z.

Asterisked (*) meanings, though found chiefly in the specified region, also have some currency in the other region; other definitions may be recognised by the other as Briticisms or Americanisms respectively. Additional usage notes are provided where useful.

A

B

C

D

E

F

G

H

I

J

K

L

See also
 List of words having different meanings in British and American English: M–Z
 List of American words not widely used in the United Kingdom
 List of British words not widely used in the United States

References

Further reading
Note: the below are general references on this topic. Individual entries have not yet been audited against the references below and readers looking for verifiable information should consult the works below unless individual entries in the article's table are properly sourced.

External links
The Septic's Companion: A British Slang Dictionaryan online dictionary of British slang, viewable alphabetically or by category

Words having different meanings in British and American English: A-L, List of
Lists of English words
American English words